Wenceslao Salgado (28 April 1900 – 29 July 1980) was a Peruvian sports shooter. He competed in the 50 m pistol event at the 1948 Summer Olympics. Salgado won a bronze medal in the 1951 Pan American Games 50 metres pistol team competition.

References

1900 births
1980 deaths
Peruvian male sport shooters
Olympic shooters of Peru
Shooters at the 1948 Summer Olympics
Sportspeople from Lima
Pan American Games bronze medalists for Peru
Pan American Games medalists in shooting
Shooters at the 1951 Pan American Games
Medalists at the 1951 Pan American Games
20th-century Peruvian people